György Tatár (born 10 September 1952) is a retired Hungarian footballer. During his club career, Tatár played for Honvéd Papp József Miskolc, Diósgyőri VTK and CD Castellón. He made 11 appearances for the Hungary national team, scoring 5 goals.

Club

Diósgyőr
By scoring five goals for Diósgyőri VTK, he has been the top scorer of the club in UEFA competitions.

Honours

Magyar Kupa: 1976–77, 1979–80

References

External links

1952 births
Living people
Hungarian footballers
Association football midfielders
Diósgyőri VTK players
CD Castellón footballers
Hungary international footballers
Hungarian expatriate footballers
Expatriate footballers in Spain
Sportspeople from Miskolc